Coulon is a commune in the Deux-Sèvres department in the Nouvelle-Aquitaine region in western France. The bibliographer Louis Perceau (1883–1942) was born in the village.

See also 
Communes of the Deux-Sèvres department

References 

Communes of Deux-Sèvres